"Slang" is a 1996 song by the English rock band Def Leppard from their gold album Slang. It reached #17 on the UK Singles Chart. The song is the only one from its parent album to be played after the Slang World Tour of 1996 to 1997, with Def Leppard performing the song most recently during their concert residency of Las Vegas in 2019.

Background
In reference to the song, lead singer Elliot said in the album's commentary that Slang is "a bit of a throwback to [Def Leppard's] original sound, in other words loads and loads of backing vocals" and said that "live, this song has always been a favourite with fans".

The single cover features the Def Leppard logo (the 1995 variation) but Slang did not feature the logo in any variation.

Video
The music video was directed by Nigel Dick. Recorded on Occidental Studios, Los Angeles in April 1996. The video was released in May 1996.

An additional "Director's Cut" video was released in October 2004, included on the Best of the Videos DVD.

Track listing

Mexican single
 "Slang"
 "Animal" (Acoustic)
 "Ziggy Stardust" (Acoustic)
 "Pour Some Sugar on Me" (Acoustic)

Souvenir Pack
 "Slang"
 "Can't Keep Away from the Flame"
 "When Love & Hate Collide (Strings & Piano only version)"

Charts

References

Def Leppard songs
1996 singles
Music videos directed by Nigel Dick
Songs written by Phil Collen
Songs written by Joe Elliott
Songs written by Vivian Campbell
Songs written by Rick Savage
1996 songs